Representative Rodgers may refer to:
 Cathy McMorris Rodgers (1969-), United States Representative (2005-)
 Norman Rodgers, (1927-), Iowa state Representative (1969-1973)
 Andrew Rodgers (1827-1922), Illinois state Representative
 Robert L. Rodgers (1875–1960), United States Representative (1939-1947)